The Delsea Regional School District is a regional public school district serving students in seventh through twelfth grades from Elk Township and Franklin Township, two constituent communities in Gloucester County, New Jersey, United States. Students from Newfield attend the district's schools as part of a sending/receiving relationship begun in September 2010 after Newfield began a process to end its prior relationship with the Buena Regional School District.

As of the 2017–18 school year, the district, comprising two schools, had an enrollment of 1,655 students and 125.3 classroom teachers (on an FTE basis), for a student–teacher ratio of 13.2:1.

The district is classified by the New Jersey Department of Education as being in District Factor Group "CD." District Factor Groups organize districts statewide to allow comparison by common socioeconomic characteristics of the local districts. From lowest socioeconomic status to highest, the categories are A, B, CD, DE, FG, GH, I and J.

The New Jersey Department of Education considered a vote by the Franklin Township Board of Education in June 2010 requesting that the district withdraw from the Delsea Regional School District, which would require that the Delsea region be dissolved as about 80% of the regional district's students come from Franklin. With the withdrawal of Franklin Township, two options being considered were to either have Franklin and Elk Townships create a new regional district with Newfield students attending on a send-receive basis, or having Franklin Township establish its own PreK-12 district which would receive students from both Elk Township and Newfield.

Schools 
Schools in the district (with 2017–18 enrollment data from the National Center for Education Statistics) are:
Delsea Regional Middle School with 525 students in grades 7 and 8
Jill Bryfogle, Principal
Mike Nicholson, Vice Principal
Delsea Regional High School with 1,080 students in grades 9 - 12
Fran Ciociola, Principal
Paul Berardelli, Vice Principal
Dr. Sydonie Maitland, Vice Principal

Administration 
Core members of the district's administration are:
Dr. Piera Gravenor, Superintendent
Joseph Collins, Business Administrator / Board Secretary

Board of education
The district's board of education, with nine members, sets policy and oversees the fiscal and educational operation of the district through its administration. As a Type II school district, the board's trustees are elected directly by voters to serve three-year terms of office on a staggered basis, with three seats up for election each year held (since 2014) as part of the November general election. The seats on the board of education are allocated to the constituent municipalities based on population, with seven seats assigned to Franklin Township and two to Elk Township.

References

External links 
Delsea Regional School District

School Data for the Delsea Regional School District, National Center for Education Statistics

Elk Township, New Jersey
Franklin Township, Gloucester County, New Jersey
New Jersey District Factor Group CD
School districts in Gloucester County, New Jersey